Icky Flix is the title of a combined DVD and CD set released by American art rock band the Residents as part of their 30th anniversary celebration in 2001.  Where the DVD featured the videos and both original and re-recorded versions of the songs, the CD featured a number of the newly recorded highlights.

DVD Track listing
"The Third Reich 'n' Roll"
"Constantinople"
"One Minute Movies: Moisture / Act Of Being Polite / Perfect Love / The Simple Song"
"Kick a Picnic"
"Songs for Swinging Larvae"
"He Also Serves"
"It's a Man's Man's Man's World" 
"Harry The Head"
"The Gingerbread Man (Concentrate)"
"Jelly Jack the Boneless Boy"
"Just For You (Disfigured Night Part 7)"
"Stars and Stripes Forever"
"Where is She?"
"Burn Baby Burn"
"Hello Skinny"
"Bad Day on the Midway (Concentrate)"
 "Vileness Fats: Title"
 "Vileness Fats: Mom's House"
 "Vileness Fats: The Cave 1"
 "Vileness Fats: The Banquet Hall"
 "Vileness Fats: The Nightclub 1 (Eloise)"
 "Vileness Fats: The Cave 2"
 "Vileness Fats: The Nightclub 2"

CD Track listing
 "Icky Flix (Theme)"
 "The Third Reich 'n' Roll"
 "Just for You (Disfigured Night, Part 7)"
 "Songs for Swinging Larvae"
 "Bad Day on the Midway"
 "Kick a Picnic"
 "The Gingerbread Man"
 "Vileness Fats: Title"
 "Vileness Fats: Mom's House"
 "Vileness Fats: The Cave 1"
 "Vileness Fats: The Banquet Hall"
 "Vileness Fats: The Nightclub 1 (Eloise)"
 "Vileness Fats: The Cave 2"
 "Vileness Fats: The Nightclub 2"
 "Icky Flix (Closing Theme)"

References

External links
 IMDB page
 Discogs Page

The Residents albums
2001 albums
2001 video albums